Peranzanes is a village and municipality located in the region of El Bierzo (province of León, Castile and León, Spain). According to the 2004 census (INE), the municipality has a population of 329 inhabitants.

Geography
Peranzanes counts the hamlets (pueblos) of Cariseda, Chano, Faro, Fresnedelo, Guimara and Trascastro.

See also
List of municipalities of El Bierzo

References

External links
 

Municipalities in El Bierzo